Peter Hanlon may refer to:
 Peter Hanlon (sportswriter)
 Peter Hanlon (boxer)